Anfiteatro José Hernandez is a multi-use stadium in Jesús María, Argentina. It is primarily used for rodeo. It hosts the Festival Nacional de la Doma y el Folclore, one of the largest rodeos in Argentina. It was also the home ground for Club Social y Deportivo Colón. The stadium holds 31,500 spectators and was built in 1966.

References

j
j
Sports venues completed in 1966
1966 establishments in Argentina